Tomopleura is a genus of sea snails, marine gastropod mollusks in the family Borsoniidae.

Description
The fusiform shell with a high spire and a truncate base is light-built with a deep, reverse "U-shaped" anal sinus on the shoulder slope and a tall, straight-sided conical spire. The apex is truncate. The sculpture of the shell shows strong spiral lirae and spiral keels with fine axial threads in the interstices. There is a spiral ridge at the lower columella. The radula is of the toxoglossan type.

Distribution
Species in this marine genus occur in Central and East Indian Ocean, off East Africa, India (E), Indo-China, Japan, Mozambique, Philippines, the Red Sea, South Africa and Australia (Northern Territory, Queensland, Western Australia).

Species
According to the World Register of Marine Species (WoRMS), the  following species with valid names are included within the genus Tomopleura :

 Tomopleura bellardii (Jousseaume, 1883)
 Tomopleura carrota (Laseron, 1954)
 Tomopleura cicatrigula (Hedley, 1922)
 † Tomopleura clifdenica Powell, 1942 
 Tomopleura coffea (Thiele, 1925)
 † Tomopleura crassispiralis (Marwick, 1929) 
 Tomopleura dilecta (Hedley, 1903)
 † Tomopleura excavata (Hutton, 1877) 
 † Tomopleura finlayi Powell, 1942
 † Tomopleura furcata Harzhauser, Raven & Landau, 2018 
 Tomopleura fuscocincta Gofas & Rolán, 2009 
 Tomopleura nivea (Philippi, 1851)
 Tomopleura oscitans Kilburn, 1986
 Tomopleura pouloensis Jousseaume, 1883 
 Tomopleura reciproca (Gould, 1860)
 Tomopleura regina (Thiele, 1925)
 Tomopleura retusispirata (Smith E. A., 1877)
 Tomopleura spiralissima Gofas & Rolán, 2009 -  synonyms = Asthenotoma spiralis (Smith, 1872), Pleurotoma spiralis, Smith, 1872 
  † Tomopleura striata (P. Marshall, 1917)
 Tomopleura subtilinea (Hedley, 1918)
 Tomopleura thisbe (Melvill, 1906)
 Tomopleura thola (Laseron, 1954)
 Tomopleura tricincta Gofas & Rolán, 2009 
 Tomopleura vertebrata (Smith E. A., 1875)
 † Tomopleura waiauensis Powell, 1942 
Species brought into synonymy
 Tomopleura albula (Hutton, 1873): synonym of Maoritomella albula (Hutton, 1873)
 Tomopleura fultoni (G.B. Sowerby III, 1888): synonym of Pulsarella fultoni (G.B. Sowerby III, 1888)
 Tomopleura ischna (Watson, 1881): synonym of Maoritomella ischna (Watson, 1881)
 Tomopleura multiplex (Webster, 1906): synonym of Maoritomella multiplex (Webster, 1881)
 Tomopleura orientalis (Dell, 1956): synonym of Maoritomella orientalis Dell, 1956
 Tomopleura reevii (Adams C. B., 1950): synonym of Drilliola reevii (C. B. Adams, 1850)
  † Tomopleura transenna (Suter, 1917): synonym of † Cryptomella transenna (Suter, 1917)

References

 Kilburn R.N. (1986). Turridae (Mollusca: Gastropoda) of southern Africa and Mozambique. Part 3. Subfamily Borsoniinae. Annals of the Natal Museum. 27: 633-720.

External links
 Casey T.L. (1904) Notes on the Pleurotomidae with description of some new genera and species. Transactions of the Academy of Science of St. Louis, 14, 123–170
  Bouchet P., Kantor Yu.I., Sysoev A. & Puillandre N. (2011) A new operational classification of the Conoidea. Journal of Molluscan Studies 77: 273-308